Khurais Airport is a small airport in the oil complex of Khurais in the Eastern Province of Saudi Arabia. The airport occupies an area of 1.2 km2 next to the residential camp. It has replaced the previous Khurais Airport (old).

Overview
Saudi Aramco, the national oil company of Saudi Arabia, owns and operate the airport providing logistic support to the remote oil complex. Using Boeing 737 and Dash 8 aircraft, the company operates scheduled flights to Dammam for the headquarters in Dhahran.

Facilities
The airport is equipped with one runway, 2,430 meters long and 30 meters wide. 7 parking/gates can be found there in addition to a helipad.

References

External links
Skyvector.com

Khurais oil field
Airports in Saudi Arabia